Gerald Rudolph "Gerry" Glackan (8 August 1923 – 1965) was an Indian hockey player who won a gold medal at the 1948 Summer Olympics.

External links
 
Gerry Glackan's profile at databaseOlympics

1923 births
1965 deaths
People from Jabalpur
Field hockey players from Madhya Pradesh
Olympic field hockey players of India
Field hockey players at the 1948 Summer Olympics
Indian male field hockey players
Olympic gold medalists for India
Anglo-Indian people
Olympic medalists in field hockey
Medalists at the 1948 Summer Olympics
Indian emigrants to England
British people of Anglo-Indian descent